Caroline Jones (born 1990) is an American country singer.

Caroline Jones may also refer to:
Caroline Chisholm or Caroline Jones (1808–1877), English humanitarian
Caroline Jones (broadcaster) (1938–2022), Australian journalist
Caroline R. Jones (1942–2001), African American advertising figure
Caroline A. Jones (born 1954), American art historian, author, curator and critic
Caroline Jones (politician) (born 1955), Welsh politician, Member of the Senedd
Caroline Quentin or Caroline Jones (born 1960), English actress, and television presenter

See also
Carolyn Jones (disambiguation)